Epicoma melanospila, the black spot moth, is a moth of the family Notodontidae. It was first described by Wallengren in 1860 and it is found in Australia.

The larvae feed on Callistemon, Eucalyptus, Leptospermum and Kunzea species.

References

Thaumetopoeinae